Mora is a former settlement in Clallam County, in the U.S. state of Washington. The GNIS classified it as a populated place.

A post office called Boston was established in 1891, however to avoid confusion with Boston, Massachusetts, it was renamed after Mora, Sweden, the native home of an early postmaster. This post office remained in operation until 1942.

References

Ghost towns in Washington (state)
Geography of Clallam County, Washington